Harmoko (born March 6, 1989) is an Indonesian footballer who currently plays for Perseta Tulungagung in Liga Indonesia Premier Division.

Club career statistics

References

External links

1989 births
Association football forwards
Living people
Indonesian footballers
Liga 1 (Indonesia) players
Persema Malang players
Persiwa Wamena players
Indonesian Premier Division players
Persekam Metro players
Sportspeople from East Java